Požarane is a village in the municipality of Vrapčište, North Macedonia.

Demographics
According to the 2002 census, the village had a total of 26 inhabitants. Ethnic groups in the village include:

Macedonians 22
Albanians 4

References

External links

Villages in Vrapčište Municipality
Albanian communities in North Macedonia